This is a list of historical and living notable Kosovar Albanians (ethnic Albanian people from Kosovo or people of full or partial Kosovar Albanian ancestry), sorted by occupation and name:

Military personnel 

Idriz Seferi - nationalist guerrilla fighter
Azem Galica - nationalist resistance fighter
Isa Boletini - nationalist guerrilla fighter
Asim Vokshi - volunteer in Spanish Civil War
Sulejman Vokshi - military leader and commander of the League of Prizren
Haxhi Zeka - nationalist leader
Bislim Bajgora - nationalist leader
Shote Galica - nationalist guerrilla fighter who was declared as the People's Heroine of Albania
Mic Sokoli - nationalist figure and guerrilla fighter
Shaban Polluzha - military leader
Idriz Gjilani - KLA commander
Zahir Pajaziti - KLA commander
Adem Jashari - KLA commander
Agim Ramadani - KLA commander
Njazi Azemi - KLA commander

Academics
Anton Berisha - scholar and folklorist
Flora Brovina - poet, pediatrician and women's rights activist from Drenica, raised in Prishtina
Din Mehmeti - poet, from Gjakova
Ali Podrimja - poet, from Gjakova
Anton Berishaj - academic, from Malsia, Montenegro living in Kosovo
Musa Haxhiu - academic, from Peja

Actors and actresses

Muharrem Qena - actor, director, writer and singer
Faruk Begolli - actor
James Biberi - American actor, who was born in Kosovo
Arta Dobroshi - actress, notable works include Lorna's Silence and Baby
Fortesa Hoti - Swedish actress, best known for her role as Roxana Nilsson, in the Swedish drama series Andra Avenyn, born in Kosovo
Arta Muçaj - actress born in Prizren Kosovo. Known for roles in Home Sweet Home as Hana and Njerez dhe Fate (People and Destinies) as Didi. Based in Australia.
Enver Petrovci - actor, writer and director

Entertainment and media

Ardian Bujupi - German-Kosovar singer-songwriter, who finished in third place of the 8th season of the German talent show Deutschland Sucht den SuperStar, born in Pristina
Rauf Dhomi - classical music composer and conductor
Rona Nishliu - singer
Tony Dovolani - professional ballroom dancer, instructor and judge based in New York
Gashi - rapper
Adelina Ismajli - singer, actress and model who was crowned Miss Kosovo in 1997
Era Istrefi - singer-songwriter
Akil Mark Koci - composer from Prizren
Memli Krasniqi - rapper, singer-songwriter, politician and spokesperson; minister the Culture, Youth and Sport of the Republic of Kosovo
Albina Kelmendi - singer and runner-up of the fourth season of The Voice of Albania
Zana Krasniqi - model and Miss Universe Kosovo 2008
Patrick Nuo - Swiss recording artist and actor, the father is an Albanian from Gjakova
Rita Ora - British singer-songwriter and actress, born in Pristina
Dua Lipa - British pop singer, parents are immigrants from Kosovo, fleeing during the war
Ismet Peja - folk singer
Nexhmije Pagarusha - singer, known for song "Baresha"
Shkëlzen Doli - violinist
Leonora Jakupi - singer
Nita Bahtiri - Kosovar singer and pianist
Lindita - Kosovo-Albanian singer-songwriter
Regard - DJ
Gjon's Tears - Swiss singer-songwriter
Ledri Vula - singer
Njomza - Kosovo born songwriter

Visual arts and design
Fatmire Zeka - artist
Rifo Dobra - photographer
Adem Kastrati - painter (1930-2000)
Gazmend Freitag - painter
Lirika Matoshi - fashion designer
Teuta Matoshi - fashion designer
Burim Myftiu - American contemporary photographer, born in Prizren
Ramadan Ramadani - painter and artist
Mustafa Presheva - Turkish film editor

Models
Diana Avdiu - Kosovar Albanian model and beauty pageant titleholder who was crowned Miss Universe Kosovo 2012
Marigona Dragusha - model who was crowned Miss Universe Kosovo in 2009; second runner-up in Miss Universe 2009
Donika Emini - Kosovar Albanian model and beauty pageant titleholder who was crowned Miss Universe Kosovo
Zana Krasniqi - Kosovar Albanian fashion model and beauty pageant titleholder who won Miss Universe Kosovo 2008
Camila Barraza - Argentinian-Kosovar model and beauty pageant titleholder who won Miss Universe Kosovo 2016 and represented Kosovo at Miss Universe 2016.
Mirjeta Shala -  Kosovar Albanian model 
Zana Berisha -  Kosovar Albanian model and beauty pageant titleholder who won Miss Kosovo 2018

Business and entrepreneurship
Florin Krasniqi - American businessman and political activist
Shkëlzen Shala - veganism activist and entrepreneur
Ramiz Tafilaj - American businessman, activist, visionary and publisher

Politics
Albin Kurti - current Prime Minister of Kosovo
Vjosa Osmani - current President of Kosovo
Lulzim Basha - Albanian politician. He is the chairman of the Democratic Party of Albania, the main opposition party, since 2013.
Agim Çeku - minister of security forces for the Republic of Kosovo
Bajram Curri - minister of defence of Albania, member of the Committee for the National Defence of Kosovo, independence activist
Nexhat Daci - member of the Assembly of Kosovo
Nexhip Draga - politician and deputy of the Ottoman and later of the Yugoslav parliament
Jakup Krasniqi - spokesman for the Kosovo Liberation Army (during the Kosovo war); Former Chairman of the Assembly of Kosovo (2007-2014); Former Acting President of Kosovo. 
Ramush Haradinaj - former Prime Minister of Kosovo (2004–05)
Sinan Hasani - former president of Yugoslavia (1986–1987), novelist, statesman and diplomat
Ali Kelmendi - communist organiser
Hasan Prishtina - former Prime Minister, nationalist, organizer of Albanian movements against Ottomans and other regimes installed in Kosovo, during the end of the 19th and beginning of the 20th century
Ymer Prizreni - cleric, jurist, politician, scholar and patriot, head leader of the Albanian League of Prizren
Bajram Rexhepi - Prime Minister of Kosovo 2002-2004
Ibrahim Rugova - first president of Kosovo (1992–2000) and (2002–2006)
Fatmir Sejdiu - first president of the Republic of Kosovo (2006–2010)
Hashim Thaçi - former Prime Minister and President of Kosovo
Azem Vllasi - senior politician and lawyer

Sports

Football

Ardit Tahiri - footballer
Allmir Ademi - Albanian-Swiss footballer
Fidan Aliti - football player
Enis Alushi - football player
Donis Avdijaj - footballer
Ilir Azemi - footballer
Zymer Bytyqi - football player
Adnan Januzaj - Belgian football player for Real Sociedad, La Liga, parents are from the Republic of Kosovo, of both Kosovan and Turkish descent
Agon Mehmeti - football player
Albert Bunjaku - Swiss-Albanian football player for Nürnberg, German Bundesliga
Almir Murati - Swiss football player who plays for Potenza S.C.
Arian Beqaj - football player for Anorthosis Famagusta, Cypriot First Division
Astrit Ajdarević - Swedish football player for Leicester City, Premier League, born in Prishtina
Beg Ferati - Swiss football player, born in Pristina
Bernard Berisha - football player
Besart Berisha - football player for Brisbane Roar, A-League
Valon Berisha - footballer player who played for Red Bull Salzburg and Lazio
Mërgim Brahimi - football player
Bersant Celina - football player
Debatik Curri - footballer
Ardin Dallku - footballer
Ibrahim Drešević - footballer
Lorik Emini - footballer
Betim Fazliji - footballer
Ardian Gashi - footballer, who played for Norway and Kosovo
Besian Idrizaj - Austrian football player for Swansea City, English League Championship, parents are from Kosovo
Besar Halimi - footballer, former player of Mainz 05
Besnik Hasi - former football player turned manager for Anderlecht, Belgian First Division A
Mehmet Hetemaj - footballer, who played several seasons in the Italian Serie B
Ylldren Ibrahimaj - footballer
Blendi Idrizi - footballer, currently playing for Schalke 04
Flamur Kastrati - footballer
Kushtrim Lushtaku - footballer
Alban Meha - footballer
Arijanet Muric - footballer, who played for Manchester City and NAC Breda
Florent Muslija - football player, who formerly played for Hannover 96
Besar Musolli - football player
Atdhe Nuhiu - football player
Leart Paqarada - footballer
Avni Pepa - footballer
Fanol Përdedaj - football player, who played for Hertha BSC
Elbasan Rashani - footballer
Anel Rashkaj - footballer
Dardan Rexhepi - footballer
Loret Sadiku - footballer
Herolind Shala - footballer, who played for Odd and Sparta Prague
Valmir Sulejmani - footballer, who formerly played for Hannover 96
Gjelbrim Taipi - footballer
Samir Ujkani - footballer, who played several seasons in Serie A and Serie B
Mërgim Vojvoda - football player currently playing for Torino F.C.
Eroll Zejnullahu - footballer
Arbër Zeneli - footballer, who played for Heerenveen and Reims
Edon Zhegrova - footballer
Drilon Shala - Finnish football player for FC Lahti, Finnish Veikkausliiga, parents are from the Republic of Kosovo
Dren Feka - German football player for Hamburger SV and Germany national youth football team U19. Parents are from Kosovo.
Emir Bajrami - Swedish football player, born in Pristina
Erton Fejzullahu - Swedish football player, born in Mitrovica
Fatmire Bajramaj (Alushi) - German football player, born in Kosovo
Faton Toski - German football player, born in Kosovo
Gezim Ljalja - Kosovar Albanian football player who played for KF Vëllaznimi and FK Galenika Zemun.
Granit Xhaka - Swiss football player, an ethnic Albanian born in Kosovo 
Johan Berisha - retired Swiss football player
Kosovare Asllani - Swedish football player, parents migrated from Kosovo to Sweden
Kristian Nushi - football player for FC St. Gallen, Swiss Super League
Labinot Haliti - Australian-Albanian football player for Western Sydney Wanderers FC, born in Pristina
Labinot Harbuzi - Swedish football player, parents migrated from Kosovo to Sweden
Liridon Krasniqi - football player play for Kedah, Malaysia Super League, born in Vitina
Lorik Cana - football player for Lazio, Italian Serie A
Mehmet Dragusha - football player for Paderborn, German 2 Bundesliga
Mentor Zhubi - Swedish football player for Örgryte IS, Swedish Superettan, born in Kosovo
Milaim Rama - Swiss football player for Augsburg, German Regional Liga Nord, born in Kosovo
Milot Rashica - football player for Werder Bremen, Bundesliga, born in Vushtrri, Kosovo 
Njazi Kuqi - Finnish football player for TuS Koblenz, German Zweite Bundesliga, born in Kosovo
Rijat Shala - Swiss football player for Novara Calcio, Italian Lega Pro 1.Divisione, born in Prizren, Kosovo
Shefki Kuqi - Finnish football player for Swansea City, English Football League Championship, born in the Kosovo
Shpetim Hasani - football player
Sokol Maliqi - Swiss-Albanian football player
Valdet Rama - football player born in Mitrovica
Valon Behrami - Swiss football player and former player of West Ham United, Premier League, born in Mitrovica
Xherdan Shaqiri - Swiss football player, born in Kosovo
Xhevat Prekazi - football manager and former player of Kosovar Albanian descent.

Basketball

Edmond Azemi - Kosovo Albanian professional basketball player who plays for Sigal Prishtina in Kosovo Basketball Superleague

Handball

Taip Ramadani - head coach of the Australian national handball team, parents are from Kosovo

American Football

Lirim Hajrullahu - Kosovar-born Canadian placekicker in both the CFL and NFL, 2017 Grey Cup champion

Boxing, Kickboxing and Wrestling

Luan Krasniqi - German professional boxer, born in Junik
Robin Krasniqi - German professional boxer, born in Junik
Xhavit Bajrami - Swiss former kickboxer, born in Dumosh
Aziz Salihu - professional boxer, born in Prishtina
Naim Terbunja - Swedish amateur boxer, born in Pristina
Rezar - professional wrestler and former mixed martial artist
Elvis Gashi - professional boxer in America, born in Peja
Ilir Latifi - professional UFC fighter for Sweden, his parents come from Kosovo
Elvir Muriqi - American-Albanian boxer, born in Kosovo
Azem Maksutaj - Swiss former kickboxer, born in Kosovo
Donjeta Sadiku - Kosovar female boxer, born in Pristina
Besar Nimani - former professional boxer, IBF European intercontinental champion

Judo

Majlinda Kelmendi - Judoka, 2013 and 2014 World Champion (52 kg), won the 2019 European Games, three European Championships (2014, 2016, 2017), the 2013 Judo World Masters, seven IJF Grand Slams, 10 IJF Grand Prix, and conquered the gold at the 2016 Summer Olympics
Distria Krasniqi - Judoka, won three IJF World Masters (2018, 2019, 2021), two IJF Grand Slams (2020 Paris and Hungary), six IJF Grand Prix (2015 Samsun, 2017 Antalya and The Hague, 2018 Antalya and Tashkent, 2019 Antalya), one European Championship and a gold medal at the 2020 Summer Olympics
Nora Gjakova - Judoka, won two IJF Grand Slams (2018, 2021), five IJF Grand Prix (2017 Antalya, 2018 Tunis, 2018  Antalya, 2019 Tbilisi), one European Championship, a gold medal at the 2018 Mediterranean Games, and conquered the gold at the 2020 Summer Olympics

See also

Albanian diaspora
List of Albanian Americans
List of people from Pristina
Lists of Albanians

References

+
Kosovo
Albanian